Vermont Route 101 (VT 101) is a state highway in the U.S. state of Vermont. The highway runs  from VT 100 north to VT 105 within Troy in northwestern Orleans County.

Route description
VT 101 begins at an intersection with VT 100 in the unincorporated village of Troy in the town of Troy. The two-lane highway heads north between the western town line and the Missisquoi River to the east. VT 101 crosses Bugbee Brook and meets the eastern end of VT 242. Near its northern end, the highway crosses Jay Branch and intersects Vielleux Road, which leads to the River Road Covered Bridge. VT 101 ends at a T-intersection with VT 105, which heads west toward Richford and north toward the incorporated village of North Troy.

Major intersections

See also

References

101
Transportation in Orleans County, Vermont
Troy, Vermont